Sidney Francis Greene, Baron Greene of Harrow Weald,  (12 February 1910 – 26 July 2004) was a trade union leader in the United Kingdom, serving as general secretary of the National Union of Railwaymen from 1957 to 1975. He promoted close ties between the union and the Labour Party, which have not persisted with its successor National Union of Rail, Maritime and Transport Workers.

Early in his career, after leaving school at age 14, Greene was a porter at Paddington station.

Appointed a Commander of the Order of the British Empire in the 1966 New Year's Honours, he was Knighted in 1970. On 21 January 1975 he was created a life peer as Baron Greene of Harrow Weald, of Harrow in the County of Greater London.

External links

Guardian obituary
Scotsman obituary

1910 births
2004 deaths
Commanders of the Order of the British Empire
General Secretaries of the National Union of Railwaymen
Knights Bachelor
Greene of Harrow Weald
Members of the General Council of the Trades Union Congress
Presidents of the Trades Union Congress
Life peers created by Elizabeth II